Bill Tung Biu (March 30, 1933 in Hong Kong — February 22, 2006) was a Hong Kong actor and horse racing commentator. Tung started off as a jockey with his family racing horse stable. He was then recruited to become a horse racing commentator. Due to his fame, he was invited to act in many movies beginning in the late 1970s. He appeared in several films with Jackie Chan during the 1980s and 1990s, such as playing Inspector "Uncle" Bill Wong in the original Police Story series, including his final movie role in Police Story 4: First Strike in 1996. Tung retired from horse racing commentating in 2000. Tung died in 2006 of lung failure.

Biography
Tung was born in Hong Kong in 1933. He started to learn horse riding when he was eight years old. He became an official horse jockey when he was twelve after graduating from the first post war Hong Kong Jockey Club training. In his short horse jockey career, he went to Singapore, United Kingdom and other countries as a professional horse jockey. After learning to be a horse trainer, Tung served in his family's stables as vice-horse trainers.

In 1967, when Rediffusion Television (now Asia Television) began broadcasting horse racing, Tung was recruited to become a horse racing commentator. Due to his frank assessment and criticism in the horse racing circles, he was respectfully called "Uncle Biu". Due to the loss of broadcasting rights, Tung was not able to continue as a commentator on television and he joined the Hong Kong Jockey Club as a radio show host. It had an effect on the radio industry as the listenership for Radio Television Hong Kong increased significantly.

After 1997, when Asia Television lost the horse racing broadcasting rights, Tung went to the Macau Jockey Club as a horse trainer. In his first year as a trainer, Tung won 64 races with the horses from his stables. He also worked as a horse racing commentator in Macau until 2000. He returned to Hong Kong as a horse racing commentator for the 2003–04 horse racing season.

In July 2005, Tung retired from the media industry due to heart disease. He had been hospitalized several times due to diabetes and heart diseases. On February 16, 2006, Tung was admitted to St. Paul's Hospital on Hong Kong Island due to physical discomfort. On February 22, 11pm, due to pulmonary fibrosis leading to organ failure, Tung died in the hospital in the company of loved ones, at the age of 72.

A funeral committee was set up and Tung's wake was held on March 13, 2006, 4 pm at the Hong Kong Coliseum. Actor and good friend Jackie Chan was one of the pall-bearers. In the afternoon of the next day, Tung was cremated at Sha Tin's crematorium.

In his four marriages, Tung had five children. His three daughters are now married. Both of his sons have died, one at a young age, and his second of cancer.

Filmography

 Luan long bo meng (1977) as himself
 Fatherland (1980, TV Series) as Yung Hok-ling
 Security Unlimited (1981) as Racetrack Announcer
 The Legendary Fok (1981, TV Series) as Fok Yan-tai
 Coolie Killer (1982)
 My Darling, My Goddess (1982) as Don Phew
 Tian ji guo he (1983)
 The Fung-shui Master (1983)
 Fast Fingers (1983) as Uncle Bill
 Esprit d'amour (1983) as Chi-Ming's Father
 Family Light Affair (1984)
 I Love Lolanto (1984)
 I Will Finally Knock You Down, Dad! (1984) as Monk
 My Little Sentimental Friend (1984)
 Dear Mummy (1985) as Inspector Bill
 Police Story (1985) as Inspector Bill Wong
 Tian guan ci fu (1985) as Ji Xiao Dong
 Happy Din Don (1986) as Ma Masa, the Crocodile King
 Devoted to You (1986) as Television Racing Commentator
 Jiang shi shao ye (1986)
 It's a Mad, Mad, Mad World (1987) as Bill
 Sworn Brothers (1987)
 Enchanting Night (1987) as Uncle Hak
 Project A II (1987) as Police Commissioner
 Mr. Handsome (1987) as Bill Lau
 Who Is the Craftiest (1988) as Leung Piu
 The Good, the Bad and the Beauty (1988) as Uncle Mark
 Dian zhi zei zei (1988)
 Bless This House (1988) as Bill Chang
 The Inspector Wears Skirts (1988) as Commissioner Tung
 Double Fattiness (1988) as Mo Chak-shu
 Ling huan xiao jie (1988) as Master Wong
 Mother vs. Mother (1988) as Dut-Hing
 Shen tan fu zi bing (1988)
 Police Story 2 (1988) as Bill Wong
 Tong tian pai dang (1988)
 Imaginary Suspense (1988) as Shek Man-Tau
 It's a Mad, Mad, Mad World II (1988) as Bill
 The Inspector Wears Skirts II (1989) as Commissioner Tung
 It's a Mad, Mad, Mad World III (1989) as Bill
 Xiao xiao xiao jing cha (1989)
 Mr Canton and Lady Rose (1989) as Tung
 My Dear Son (1989) as Ho Ka-chai
 Fu gui kai xin gui (1989)
 Tragic Heroes (1989) as Uncle Gwai
 The Final Judgement (1989) as Officer Kent Chan
 Ghostly Vixen (1990) as Wizard
 Look Out, Officer! (1990) as Chang Piao
 Xi huan de gu shi (1990)
 Si ren xin shi jie (1990)
 Doctor's Heart (1990) as Man-Tsun's Father
 The Banquet (1991) as Uncle Bill
 Hong Kong Eva (1992)
 It's a Mad, Mad, Mad World Too (1992) as Bill
 Freedom Run Q (1992)
 Police Story 3 (1992) as 'Uncle' Bill Wong
 Meng qing ren (1993)
 Police Story 3 Part 2 (1993) as Uncle Bill
 Drunken Master II (1994) as General (uncredited)
 Ma shen (1994)
 Rumble in the Bronx (1995) as Uncle Bill
 Police Story 4: First Strike (1996) as 'Uncle' Bill Wong (final film role)

References

External links
 
 Hong Kong Cinemagic entry

Hong Kong male film actors
1933 births
2006 deaths
Deaths from emphysema
20th-century Hong Kong male actors
Hong Kong male television actors